The Czech Social Democratic Party (ČSSD) is a social-democratic political party in the Czech Republic. Sitting on the centre-left of the political spectrum and holding pro-European views, it is a member of the Party of European Socialists, the Socialist International, and the Progressive Alliance. Masaryk Democratic Academy is the party-affiliated's think tank.

The ČSSD was a junior coalition party within Andrej Babiš' Second Cabinet's minority government from June 2018, and was a senior coalition party from 1998 to 2006 and from 2013 to 2017. It held 15 seats in the Chamber of Deputies of the Czech Republic following the 2017 Czech legislative election in which the party lost 35 seats. From 2018 to 2021, the party was led by Jan Hamáček, who has since been replaced by Michal Šmarda as leader after the 2021 Czech legislative election, in which the party lost all of its seats after falling below 5%.

History 

The Social Democratic Czechoslavonic party in Austria was a political group founded on 7 April 1878 in Austria-Hungary as a regional wing of the Social Democratic Party of Austria. Founded in Břevnov atop earlier social democratic initiatives, such as the Ouls, it represented much of the Kingdom of Bohemia in the Austrian parliament, and its significant role in the political life of the empire was one of the factors that led to the creation of an independent Czechoslovakia. After the collapse of Austria-Hungary at the end of World War I, the party became one of the leading parties of the first Czechoslovak Republic. Its members were split over whether to join the Comintern, which in 1921 resulted in the fracturing of the party, with a large part of its membership then forming the new Communist Party of Czechoslovakia.

During the occupation of Czechoslovakia by Nazi Germany, the party was officially abolished, but its members organized resistance movements contrary to the laws of the German-controlled Protectorate of Bohemia and Moravia, both at home and abroad. After the re-establishment of the Czechoslovak Republic in 1945, the party returned to its pre-war structure and became a member of the National Front which formed a new governing coalition. In 1948, after the Communist Party of Czechoslovakia gained a parliamentary majority, the Czech Social Democratic Party was incorporated into the Communist Party. At the time of the Prague Spring, a reformist movement in 1968, there were talks about allowing the recreation of a social democratic party, but Soviet intervention put an end to such ideas. It was only after the Velvet Revolution of 1989 that the party was recreated. Since the dissolution of Czechoslovakia, which came into effect on 1 January 1993, the ČSSD has been one of the major political parties of the Czech Republic, and until October 2017 was always one of the two parties with the largest number of seats in the Chamber of Deputies.

At the 1998 Czech legislative election, the party won the largest number of seats but failed to form a coalition government, so formed a minority government under its leader Miloš Zeman.  With only 74 seats out of 200, the government had confidence and supply from the Civic Democratic Party (ODS), under the so-called Opposition Agreement. At the 2002 Czech legislative election, the party gained 70 of the 200 seats in the Chamber of Deputies of the Czech Republic. Its leader Vladimír Špidla became prime minister, heading a coalition with two small centre-right parties, the Christian and Democratic Union – Czechoslovak People's Party (KDU–ČSL) and the Freedom Union – Democratic Union (US-DEU) until he was forced to resign in 2004 after the ČSSD lost in the 2004 European Parliament election in the Czech Republic.

The next leader was Stanislav Gross, serving as leader from 26 June 2004 to 26 April 2005 and as prime minister from 4 August 2004 to 25 April 2005. He resigned after a scandal when he was unable to explain the source of money used to buy his house. The successor of Gross as prime minister was Jiří Paroubek, while Bohuslav Sobotka became acting party leader from 26 April 2005 to 13 May 2006. Paroubek was then elected as the new party leader in the run-up to the 2006 Czech legislative election, at which the party won 32.3% of the vote and 74 out of 200 seats. The election at first caused a stalemate, since the centre-right parties plus the Green Party and the centre-left parties each had exactly 100 seats. The stalemate was broken when two ČSSD deputies, Miloš Melčák and Michal Pohanka, abstained during a vote of confidence, allowing a coalition of the Civic Democrats (ODS), the KDU-ČSL, and the Green Party to form a government, while the ČSSD went into opposition.

At the 2010 Czech legislative election, the ČSSD gained 22.08% of the vote but remained the largest party, with 56 seats. Failing to form a governing coalition, it remained in opposition to a government coalition of the ODS, conservative TOP 09 and conservative-liberal Public Affairs parties. Paroubek resigned as leader on 7 June and was succeeded by Sobotka. It remained the largest party after the 2013 Czech legislative election, and in December of the same year formed a governing coalition with the populist ANO 2011 and the centrist Christian and Democratic Union – Czechoslovak People's Party. The leader of ČSSD, Bohuslav Sobotka, became the new Prime Minister of the Czech Republic.

The party suffered heavy losses in the 2017 Czech legislative election and was reduced to 15 seats, the worst result in its history. ČSSD suffered another defeat in the Prague Municipal, local and Senate elections in 2018. ČSSD lost 12 senators (only one managed to win re-election), all Prague deputies and more than half of their local councillors. In 2019 ČSSD lost all their representatives in the European Parliament. Some political commentators have interpreted the string of poor results as a sign of ČSSD losing their position in national politics. ČSSD suffered another defeat in 2020 Regional Elections and Senate elections, when they lost 10 senators (none re-elected) and 97 regional deputies. From 2018 to 2021, ČSSD had Jan Hamáček as First Deputy Prime Minister and Minister of Interior, Jana Maláčová as Minister of Labour and Social Affairs, Lubomír Zaorálek as Minister of Culture, and Miroslav Toman as Minister of Agriculture. After the poor performance of the ČSSD in the 2021 Czech legislative election, in which the party failed to meet the 5% voting threshold, Hamáček resigned as leader of the party.

Organization

Names 
Czech lands as part of Austria-Hungary:
 1878–1893, the Czechoslavonic Social Democratic Party in Austria (Sociálně-demokratická strana českoslovanská v Rakousku), then-part of the Social Democratic Party of Austria
 1893–1918, the Czechoslavonic Social Democratic Workers' Party (Českoslovanská sociálně demokratická stranu dělnická), an independent party
Czechoslovakia:
 1918–1938, the Czechoslovak Social Democratic Workers' Party (Československá sociálně demokratická strana dělnická), which merged with the Social Democratic Party of Slovakia, and was a member of the Labour and Socialist International between 1923 and 1938;<ref>Kowalski, Werner. Geschichte der sozialistischen Arbeiter-Internationale: 1923 – 1938, Berlin: Dt. Verl. d. Wissenschaften, 1985. p. 327.</ref> after the splitup of Austria-Hungary, the Czechoslovak Social Democratic Workers Party in the Republic of Austria split from the main party
 1938–1941, the National Labor Party (Národní strana práce), which was the united left party of Social Democrats in Slovakia and part of the Czechoslovak National Socialist Party
 1945–1948, the Czechoslovak Social Democracy (Československá sociální demokracie)
 1948–1989, it merged with the Communist Party of Czechoslovakia but concurrently existed as an exile party with its headquarters in London
 1990–1993, the Czechoslovak Social Democracy (Československá sociální demokracie)
Czech Republic:
 Since 1993, it has been known as the Czech Social Democratic Party (Česká strana sociálně demokratická), keeping the previous abbreviation ČSSD

 Logos 

 Policy positions 
In economic matters, the ČSSD party platform is typical of Western European social democratic parties. It supports a mixed economy, a strong welfare state, and progressive taxation. In foreign policy, it supports European integration, including joining the Eurozone, and is critical of the foreign policy of the United States, especially when in opposition, though it does not oppose membership of the Czech Republic in NATO.

 Membership 

 Further references

 Election results 
 Cisleithanian elections 
 Imperial Council elections 

 Czechoslovakia wide elections 
 Legislative elections 

 Devolved assembly elections 
 Czech assembly elections 

 Slovak assembly elections 

 Czech Republic wide elections

 Legislative elections 

 Senate elections 

 Notes
 In 1996, the whole Senate elected (81 seats), while in next elections only one third of seats is to be contested.

 Presidential elections 

 European Parliament elections 

 Regional elections 

 Local elections 

 Prague municipal elections 

 Chairmen 

 Czechoslavonic Social Democratic Workers' Party 
 Antonín Němec (1904–1915)
 Bohumír Šmeral (1916–1917)

 Czechoslovak Social Democratic Workers' Party 
 Antonín Němec (1917–1925)
 Antonín Hampl (1925–1938)

 Czechoslovak Social Democracy 
 Zdeněk Fierlinger (1945–1947)
 Bohumil Laušman (1947–1948)

 Czechoslovak Social Democracy in-exile 
 Blažej Vilím (1948)
 Václav Majer (1948–1972)
 Vilém Bernard (1972–1989)
 Karel Hrubý

 Czechoslovak Social Democracy 
 Slavomír Klaban (1989-1990)
 Jiří Horák (1990–1993)

 Czech Social Democratic Party 
 Miloš Zeman (28 February 1993 – April 2001)
 Vladimír Špidla (April 2001 – 26 July 2004)
 Stanislav Gross (26 July 2004 – 26 April 2005)
 Bohuslav Sobotka (2005–2006; acting)
 Jiří Paroubek (2006–2010)
 Bohuslav Sobotka (2011–2017)
 Milan Chovanec (2017-2018; acting)
 Jan Hamáček (2018–2021)
 Roman Onderka (2021; acting'')
 Michal Šmarda (since 2021)

See also 
 Bohumil Laušman
 Elections in the Czech Republic
 Politics of the Czech Republic

Notes

References

External links 

  
 Religious wing website
 Women wing website
 Party basic data in English

 
1878 establishments in Austria-Hungary
Social democratic parties in the Czech Republic
Political parties established in 1878